Glyphipterix platydisema is a species of sedge moth in the genus Glyphipterix. It was described by Oswald Bertram Lower in 1893. It is found in Australia, including Victoria and Tasmania.

References

Moths described in 1893
Glyphipterigidae
Moths of Australia